Somatina syneorus is a moth of the  family Geometridae. It is found in Cameroon and Gabon.

References

Moths described in 1915
Scopulini
Insects of Cameroon
Fauna of Gabon
Moths of Africa